Robert Thomas Schafer (March 29, 1933 – February 15, 2005) is a retired American basketball player. The 6' 3" guard out of Roman Catholic High School in Philadelphia played college basketball for Villanova University from 1952 to 1955. 

Schafer was the first Villanova player to score 2000 points, and earned All-America honors in 1954.

Biography
In 1951, during his college career, Schafer was forcefully approached by three men who tried to intimidate him into throwing some games. He rejected their advances and reported the matter to the FBI.

Schafer played professional basketball for the NBA's St. Louis Hawks in 1955–56, and for the Syracuse Nationals in 1956–57.

References

1933 births
2005 deaths
American men's basketball players
Philadelphia Warriors draft picks
St. Louis Hawks players
Syracuse Nationals players
Villanova Wildcats men's basketball players
Guards (basketball)
Basketball players from Philadelphia